Dürrbach is a river of Baden-Württemberg, Germany.

The Dürrbach springs northeast of the district and similar named mountain Frauenkopf of Stuttgart.

See also
List of rivers of Baden-Württemberg

References

Rivers of Baden-Württemberg
Rivers of Germany